Townships are the third-level administrative divisions of Myanmar. They are the sub-divisions of the Districts of Myanmar.  According to the Myanmar Information Management Unit (MIMU), as of December 2015, there are 330 townships in Myanmar.

Townships are the basic administrative unit of local governance and are the only type of administrative division that covers the entirety of Myanmar. A Township is administered by a Township Administrator, a civil servant appointed through the General Administration Department (GAD) of the Ministry of Home Affairs (MOHA). The Minister of Home Affairs is to be appointed by the military according to the 2008 constitution. Townships are supervised by Districts.

Here is a list of townships of Myanmar by state/region and district:

Central Myanmar

Magway Region

Mandalay Region

Notes:
1 - formerly from Myingyan District

Naypyidaw Union Territory

East Burma

Kayah State

Shan State

East Shan State

North Shan State

Notes:
1 - part of Pa Laung Self-Administered Zone
2 - part of Kokang Self-Administered Zone
3 - part of Wa Self-Administered Division

South Shan State

Notes:
1 - part of Pa-O Self-Administered Zone
2 - part of Danu Self-Administered Zone

Lower Burma

Ayeyarwady Region

Bago Region

East Bago Region

Notes:
1 - formerly from Taungoo District

West Bago Region

Notes:
1 - formerly from Pyay District

Yangon Region

Notes

1 - part of South Yangon City
2 - part of North Yangon City

North Burma

Kachin State

Sagaing Region

Notes:
1 - part of Naga Self-Administered Zone
2 - formerly from Monywa District

South Burma

Kayin State

Mon State

Tanintharyi Region

West Burma

Chin State

Rakhine State

References

 
Townships, Myanmar